District 8 is an urban district (quận) of Ho Chi Minh City, the largest city in Vietnam.

It is divided into 16 small subsets called wards (phường), numbered from Ward 1 to Ward 16.

Geographical location
District 8 borders District 5 and District 6 to the north, District 4 and District 7 to the east, Bình Chánh District to the south, and Bình Tân District to the west.

References

Districts of Ho Chi Minh City